The 1910 College Football All-America team is composed of college football players who were selected as All-Americans for the 1910 college football season. The only selector for the 1910 season who has been recognized as "official" by the National Collegiate Athletic Association (NCAA) is Walter Camp. Many other sports writers, newspapers, coaches and others also selected All-America teams in 1910. The magazine Leslie's Weekly attempted to develop a consensus All-American by polling 16 football experts and aggregating their votes. Others who selected All-Americans in 1911 include The New York Times, The New York Sun, and sports writer Wilton S. Farnsworth of the New York Evening Journal.

The 1910 Harvard Crimson football team compiled a record of 9–0–1 and outscored opponents 161 to 5. Harvard allowed only one team to score a point and played Yale to a 0–0 tie. A total of eight Harvard players were named first-team All-Americans by at least one selector. They are Hamilton Corbett, Robert Fisher, Richard Plimpton Lewis, Robert Gordon McKay, Wayland Minot, Lawrence Dunlap Smith, Percy Wendell, and Lothrop "Ted" Withington.

Only three players from schools outside of the Ivy League were selected as consensus first-team All-Americans. They are Albert Benbrook and Stanfield Wells from Michigan and James Walker of Minnesota.

Walter Camp's "official" selections

The only individual who has been recognized as an "official" selector by the National Collegiate Athletic Association (NCAA) for the 1910 season is Walter Camp. Accordingly, the NCAA's official listing of "Consensus All-America Selections" mirrors Camp's first-team picks. Eight of Camp's first-team All-Americans in 1910 played on teams from the Ivy League. The only players recognized by Camp from outside the Ivy League were Albert Benbrook and Stanfield Wells from Michigan and James Walker of Minnesota.

Camp's first-team selections for 1910 were:
 Albert Benbrook, guard from Michigan. Benbrook was inducted into the College Football Hall of Fame in 1971. He weighed over 200 pounds, was considered "huge for his time," and was known as a "dominating force" due to his "exceptional quickness."
 Ernest Cozens, center from Penn. Cozens was "one of the first of the roving centers." In the 1910 game between Penn and the Haskell Indian School, Cozens intercepted a pass and returned it 80 yards for a touchdown. He was also the catcher for the Penn baseball team. After graduating from Penn, Cozens was a football coach at Carnegie Tech.
 Bob Fisher, guard from Harvard. Fisher later coached Harvard from 1919 to 1925 and was inducted into the College Football Hall of Fame in 1973.
 John "Kil" Kilpatrick. Kilpatrick played at the end position for Yale. He was inducted into the College Football Hall of Fame in 1955. He later ran Madison Square Garden for more than 25 years and oversaw the operations of the New York Rangers from 1934 to 1960. He was inducted into the Hockey Hall of Fame in 1960.
 Robert McKay, tackle for Harvard. McKay later served as the commander of the 305th Infantry Machine Gun Division, known as "Death", during World War I.
 Leroy Mercer, fullback for Penn, inducted into the College Football Hall of Fame in 1955.
 Talbot Pendleton, halfback from Princeton. Talbot was also a sprinter for Princeton's track team.
 Earl Sprackling, quarterback from Brown. Sprackling was inducted into the College Football of Fame in 1964.
 James Walker, tackle from Minnesota. Walker later became an orthopedic surgeon.
 Stanfield Wells, end from Michigan. Though known principally as an end, Wells was Michigan's first forward passer of note. He threw two passes to help Michigan win the Western Conference championship against Minnesota in 1910. He later played professional football.
 Percy Wendell, halfback from Harvard. He was elected to the College Football Hall of Fame in 1972. He later coached football at Boston University, Williams College, and Lehigh.

Other selectors
By 1910, there was a proliferation of newspapers, sports writers, coaches and others choosing All-America teams. Recognizing the difficulties faced by any single person who could only watch one game per week, some began to seek better methodologies for selecting a true "consensus" All-America team. Leslie's Weekly sought to identify a consensus All-America team. Its team was compiled by Edward Bushnell, the editor of the official year book of the intercollegiate association of amateur athletics, by polling "sixteen men who he regards as the best experts in America." The experts polled were all associated with Eastern colleges and universities: Joseph B. Pendleton of Bowdoin, Dave Fultz of Brown, Carl S. Williams of Penn, Carl Marshall of Harvard, M.V. Bergen and James Hugh Moffatt of Princeton, Thomas Murphy of Harvard, A.C. Whiting and Charles Morice of Cornell, Clarence Weymouth of Yale, Fred Crolius of Dartmouth, Horatio B. Hackett of West Point, Walter R. Okeson of Lehigh, and Wilmer G. Crowell of Swarthmore. Eleven of the twelve players selected as consensus All-Americans by Leslie's Weekly played for Ivy League teams. The sole exception was Albert Benbrook of Michigan.

Bushnell's efforts revealed that two of Camp's picks were not truly "consensus" picks among the Eastern experts. The two players overlooked by Camp, but recognized by Leslie's Weekly, are:
 Lawrence Dunlap Smith, end from Harvard, was selected by 11 of 16 Eastern experts polled. Camp chose Stanfield Wells of Michigan instead of Smith.
 Jim Scully, tackle from Yale, was selected by 8 of 16 Eastern experts polled. Camp chose James Walker of Minnesota instead of Scully.

Concerns over Eastern bias
The dominance of Ivy League players on Camp's All-America teams led to criticism over the years that his selections were biased against players from the leading Western universities, including Chicago, Michigan, Minnesota, Wisconsin, and Notre Dame. Many selectors picked only Eastern players. For example, Wilton S. Farnsworth's All-American eleven for the New York Evening Journal was made up of five players from Harvard, two from West Point, and one each from Yale, Princeton, Penn, and Brown.

The selectors were typically Eastern writers and former players who attended only games in the East. In December 1910, The Mansfield News, an Ohio newspaper, ran an article headlined: "All-American Teams of East Are Jokes: Critics Who Never Saw Western Teams Play to Name Best in Country -- Forget About Michigan, Minnesota and Illinois." The article noted: "Eastern sporting editors must be devoid of all sense of humor, judging by the way in which they permit their football writers to pick 'All-American' elevens. What man in the lot that have picked 'All-American' elevens this fall, saw a single game outside the North Atlantic States? With a conceit all their own they fail to recognize that the United States reaches more than 200 miles in any direction from New York. ... Suppose an Ohio football writer picked 'All-American' teams. Ohio readers would not stand for it. But apparently the eastern readers will swallow anything."

All-Americans of 1910

Ends

 Stanfield Wells, Michigan (WC–1; CP; OUT)
 John Kilpatrick, Yale (WC–1; LES-1 (16); CP; OUT; ES; NYT-1; TC-1; NYEJ; NYS; NYH; TEL; NYEW; PP-1; COY-1; WT; PD; NYG; NYMT; PT; ALS; PL; Penn)
 Lawrence Dunlap Smith, Harvard (WC–2; LES-1 (11); OUT; ES; NYT-1; TC-2; NYS; NYH; TEL; PP-1; PD; NYG; NYMT; PT)
 Richard Plimpton Lewis, Harvard (TC-1; NYEJ)
 Edward J. Daly, Dartmouth (WC–2; NYT-2; OUT; NYEW; PL)
 Springer H. Brooks, Yale (NYT-2; WT)
 Arthur Berndt, Indiana (OUT)
 William Marks, Penn (TC-2; PP-2)
 Woodcock, Lafayette (PP-2)
 Tom Piollet, Penn State (ALS; Penn)
 Harold Eyrich, Cornell (WC–3)
 James Dean, Wisconsin (WC–3)

Tackles
 Robert McKay, Harvard (WC–1; LES-1 (14); CP; OUT; ES; NYT-1; TC-1; NYEJ; NYS; TEL; NYEW; PP-1; COY-1; WT; PD; NYG; NYMT; PT; ALS; Penn)
 James Walker Minnesota (WC–1; TC-1; OUT)
 James W. "Jim" Scully, Yale (WC–2; LES-1 (8); ES; NYT-2; NYS; NYH; TEL; NYEW; PP-2; PD; NYMT; PL; Penn)
 Lothrop "Ted" Withington, Harvard (LES-2 (7); NYT-2; CP; OUT; NYEJ; NYH; PP-1; WT; NYG; PT; PL)
 Ralph W. "Bud" Sherwin, Dartmouth (NYT-1; TC-2)
 Brenton G. Smith, Brown (WC–2)
 Rodgers, Penn (TC-2)
 Alfred L. Buser, Wisconsin (OUT)
 Homer Dutter, Illinois (OUT)
 Rudolph "Rudy" Probst, Syracuse (OUT)
 William Munk, Cornell (PP-2)
 Huber “Polly” Grimm, Washington (WC–3)
 Sylvester V. Shonka, Nebraska (WC–3)

Guards

 Albert Benbrook, Michigan (College Football Hall of Fame) (WC–1; LES-1 (12); TC-1; CP; OUT; ES; TEL; PP-1; WT; PD; NYG; NYMT; PT; ALS; PL; Penn)
 Bob Fisher, Harvard (College Football Hall of Fame) (WC–1; LES-1 (11); CP; OUT; ES; NYT-1; TC-1; NYEJ; NYS; NYH; TEL; NYEW; PP-2; WT; PD; NYMT; ALS; Penn)
 Joseph L. Wier, West Point (WC–2; LES-2 (4); NYEJ; COY-1; PT)
 John Brown, Navy (College Football Hall of Fame) (WC–2; LES-2 (4); NYT-2; NYS; NYH; ALS [t]; PL)
 T. S. Wilson, Princeton (NYT-2; TC-2; NYEW; PP-1; NYG)
 Wayland Minot, Harvard (NYT-1)
 Effingham Morris, Yale (WC–2 [as C]; COY-1)
 Glenn D. Butzer, Illinois (OUT; WC–3)
 George Bromley, Minnesota (TC-2)
 Edwin Foresman, Lafayette (PP-2)
 Will Metzger, Vanderbilt (WC–3)

Centers
 Ernest Cozens, Penn (WC–1; LES-1 (16); OUT; ES; NYT-1; TC-1; NYS; NYH; TEL; NYEW; PP-1; WT; NYG; NYMT; PT; ALS; Penn)
 Archibald Vincent Arnold, Army (OUT; TC-2; NYT-2; NYEJ)
 Effingham Morris, Yale (CP; OUT)
 Ralph Galvin, Pittsburgh (PD; PL)
 John Twist, Illinois (OUT)
 Harry Hartman, Syracuse (OUT)
 Forsman, Lafayette (OUT)
 Charles P. Sisson, Brown (WC–3)

Quarterbacks
 Earl Sprackling, Brown (College Football Hall of Fame) (WC–1; LES-1 (12); CP; OUT; ES; NYT-1; TC-2; NYEJ; NYS; NYH; TEL; NYEW; PP-2; COY-1; WT; PD; NYG; NYMT; PT; ALS; PL; Penn)
 Art Howe, Yale (College Football Hall of Fame) (WC–2; NYT-2; OUT; PP-1)
 John McGovern, Minnesota (College Football Hall of Fame) (WC–3; TC-1; OUT)
 John E. Ingersoll, Dartmouth (OUT; NYEW [fb])
 James Scott, Penn (OUT)
 Schef, Illinois (OUT)
 V. Ballou, Princeton (OUT)
 Ashel Cunningham, Indiana (OUT)
 James Dean, Wisconsin (OUT)
 G. H. Fletcher, Purdue (OUT)

Halfbacks

 Percy Wendell, Harvard (College Football Hall of Fame) (WC–1; LES-1 (13); ES; NYT-1; TC-1; CP [fb]; OUT; NYS; NYH [fb]; TEL; NYEW; PP-1; COY-1; WT [fb]; PD; NYG; NYMT; PT; ALS; Penn)
 Talbot Pendleton, Princeton (WC–1; LES-1 (7); CP; OUT; NYT-2; TC-2; NYEJ; NYH; NYEW; WT; PL)
 Joe Magidsohn, Michigan (LES-2 (5); TC-1; CP; OUT; TEL; PP-2; WT; PD; NYG; NYMT; PT; ALS; PL; Penn)
 James Russell McKay, Brown (WC-2 [fb]; LES-2 (3); NYT-2 [fb]; TC-2; OUT; ES; NYS; PP-2; COY-1)
 Hamilton Corbett, Harvard (NYT-2; OUT; NYEJ)
 Fred "Tex" Ramsdell, Penn (WC-3; OUT; PP-1)
 Fred J. Daly, Yale (NYT-1; OUT)
 John W. Field, Yale (WC–2; OUT)
 John P. Dalton, Navy (WC–2)
 John Rosenwald, Minnesota(OUT)
 Thomas Andrew Gill, Indiana (OUT)
 William Crawley, Chicago (OUT)
 C. M. Taylor, Oregon (WC–3)

Fullbacks
 Leroy Mercer, Penn (College Football Hall of Fame) (WC–1; LES-1 (9); OUT; ES; TC-1; NYEJ; NYS; NYH [hb]; TEL; PP-1; COY-1; NYG; NYMT; PT; ALS; PL; Penn)
 John Dalton, Navy (NYT-1; OUT)
 Ed Hart, Princeton (LES-2 (3); TC-2; PP-2)
 Reuben Johnson, Minnesota (OUT)
 Pete Hauser, Carlisle (OUT)
 Tex Richards, Pittsburgh (PD)
 Ham Corbett, Harvard (WC–3)

Key
NCAA recognized selectors for 1910
 WC = Collier's Weekly as selected by Walter Camp

Other selectors
 LES = Leslie's Weekly, Consensus All-America team compiled by Edward Bushnell, editor of the official year book of the intercollegiate association of amateur athletics, by polling "sixteen men who he regards as the best experts in America." The experts polled were all associated with Easter schools: Joseph B. Pendleton of Bowdoin, Dave Fultz of Brown, Carl S. Williams of Penn, Carl Marshall of Harvard, M.V. Bergen and James Hugh Moffatt of Princeton, Thomas Murphy of Harvard, A.C. Whiting and Charles Morice of Cornell, Clarence Weymouth of Yale, Fred Crolius of Dartmouth, Horatio B. Hackett of West Point, Walter R. Okeson of Lehigh, and Wilmer G. Crowell of Swarthmore. The numbers in parentheses are the number of votes (out of 16 total) that the player received. Players not named to the consensus team, but who polled at least three votes, are identified as second team.
 OUT = Outing magazine, honor roll of the game's top players "chosen on the judgement of various coaches of college football elevens"; at some positions multiple selections without designation as first or second teams
 ES = Evening Standard. This was determined by the consensus among the various Eastern football experts who picked All-American teams.
 NYT = The New York Times
 TC = Tommy Clark
 NYEJ = Selected by sports writer, W.S. Farnsworth, of the New York Evening Journal
 NYS = The New York Sun
 NYH = New York Herald
 TEL = New York Telegraph
 NYEW = New York Evening World
 PP = The Philadelphia Press
 COY = Former Yale star Ted Coy
 CP = The Cincinnati Post
 WT = Washington Times
 PD = Pittsburgh Dispatch
 NYG = New York Globe, by Burton S. Brown
 NYMT = New York Morning Telegraph
 PT = Philadelphia Times
 ALS = Andrew Latham Smith, Penn coach for the Philadelphia Bulletin
 PL = Pittsburgh Leader
 Penn = The Pennsylvanian

Bold = Consensus All-American
 1 – First-team selection
 2 – Second-team selection
 3 – Third-team selection

See also
 1910 All-Southern college football team
 1910 All-Western college football team

References

All-America Team
College Football All-America Teams